Calliotropis blacki is a species of sea snail, a marine gastropod mollusk in the family Eucyclidae.

Description
The length of the shell reaches 33 mm.

Distribution
This marine species occurs off the Kermadec Islands and New Caledonia.

References

 Marshall B. A. (1979). The Trochidae and Turbinidae of the Kermadec Ridge (Mollusca: Gastropoda). New Zealand Journal of Zoology 6: 521–552-page(s): 527
 Vilvens C. (2007) New records and new species of Calliotropis from Indo-Pacific. Novapex 8 (Hors Série 5): 1–72.

External links

blacki
Gastropods described in 1979